Minim, Inc., formerly Zoom Telephonics, is an American networking company that develops software and designs hardware for Internet security. Headquartered in Manchester, New Hampshire, the company offers a mobile app, cable modems, gateways, WiFi routers, mesh WiFi systems, and other home networking products with an emphasis on home automation.

History 

Zoom Telephonics was founded in 1977 as a home networking product manufacturer, headquartered in Boston, Massachusetts. The company was founded by Frank B. Manning and Bruce Kramer, two fellow roommates and graduates of the Massachusetts Institute of Technology (MIT) who had known each other since the late 1960s. The company's first product was a modification kit for telephones that turned off the phone's ringer with the flick of a switch. Branded the "Silencer", it generated US$200,000 in the first few years of Zoom's existence and prompted the founders to release more telephonic gadgets. The pair released an automatic dialer, called the "Demon Dialer", in 1980. Developed for customers of independent phone companies wanting to make long-distance calls, which required dialing call prefix and feature group digits, the product helped Zoom grow to $6 million in annual sales. The practice of demon dialing lends its namesake to this product. The "Demon Dialer" proved short-lived in usefulness after the breakup of the Bell System, which allowed these independent companies to harness so-called 1+10 dialing, so Zoom turned to developing dial-up modems for microcomputers such as the Apple II and the IBM PC. Their first modem, introduced in 1983 and called the Networker, was so popular that the company had difficulty finding enough shelf space in retail outlets, so Zoom's executives turned to mail order as an alternative sales channel. By 1987, the company had enough brand recognition to convince personal computer manufacturers, enterprise distributors, and high-volume retailers to stock Zoom's modems, and the company abandoned direct mail. In 1990, Zoom went public on the Nasdaq.

With the spread of the Internet in the mid-1990s, Zoom became a market leader in the modem business. Although the company contracted the manufacture of some of their cheaper products offshore at this time, some were still manufactured in their factory in Boston. Zoom's dominance waned with the advent of affordable broadband Internet in the early 2000s, however, and despite contracting factories in Mexico to manufacture Zoom-branded cable modem, most broadband customers were complacent with the ones provided by their ISPs. Between then and 2015, Zoom stagnated. In 2015, the company reached a five-year licensing agreement with Motorola Mobility beginning 2016, to use the Motorola brand on its home network and cable products. Motorola had divested its existing Motorola Home business to Arris Group in 2013 (following the sale of Motorola Mobility to Google), but this primarily included a transitional license to the Motorola trademark in these segments. Following this, sales rose 66 percent to roughly $17.8 million. Between 2017 and 2018, sales rose again, to $32 million.

In December 2020, the company completed a merger with Minim, Inc. and rebranded to Minim.

References

External links

Companies formerly listed on the Nasdaq
Companies traded over-the-counter in the United States
Computer companies of the United States
Computer hardware companies
Networking hardware companies
Technology companies based in the Boston area
Telecommunications companies of the United States